The City of Louisville is a home rule municipality located in southeastern Boulder County, Colorado, United States. The city population was 21,226 at the 2020 United States Census. Louisville began as a mining community in 1877, experienced a period of labor violence early in the 20th century, and transitioned to a suburban residential community when the mines closed in the 1950s.

History
The town of Louisville dates back to the start of the Welch Mine in 1877, the first coal mine in an area of Boulder and Weld counties known as the Northern Coalfield. The town was named for Louis Nawatny, a local landowner who platted his land and named it for himself. Incorporation came several years later in 1882.

The Northern Coalfield proved to be highly productive, and eventually, some 30 different mines operated within the current boundaries of Louisville, though not all at the same time. During the years of peak production (1907–09), 12 mines were in operation in Louisville, including the Acme Mine whose two million tons of coal came from directly beneath the center of town. The presence of many independent mining companies in Louisville saved the town from becoming a "company town", wholly owned and dominated by a single mining company.

Coal from the Northern Coalfield was sub-bituminous (low grade) and could not be transported long distances because of problems with self-combustion. Mining generally took place in the winter months since that was the period that demanded fuel for heating. During the summers, the miners played in local baseball leagues, with the home field named "Miners Field".

A great deal of mythology has arisen around the stories of tunnels that connected saloons throughout the city, but these have proven to be unfounded and undocumented. Instead, during labor conflicts, many citizens found refuge in dirt basements to avoid errant bullets being fired from mine compounds into the city. From 1910 to 1914, the Northern Colorado Coalfields were in the midst of a strike by the United Mine Workers and the Rocky Mountain Fuel Company based on working conditions, pay, and working hours. When miners walked out on the Hecla Mine northeast of Louisville, the company hired the Baldwin–Felts Detective Agency to guard the mine compound. A machine gun and spotlight were placed in a tower on the Hecla property, and when miners took out their frustration by shooting their guns at the compound, the detectives responded by returning their fire by randomly firing at the town. The northernmost engagement of the Colorado Coalfield War occurred in Louisville between a small contingent of Colorado National Guard and Baldwin-Felts, led by Captain Hildreth Frost against strikers following the Ludlow Massacre in April 1914.

Eventually, the coal remaining in the Northern Coalfield became increasingly uneconomical to mine, and the last coal mines operating in Louisville closed in the 1950s.

In 2001, the city changed from a statutory city and became a home rule city. The home rule debate came about when Xcel Energy announced plans to replace old power line poles with much larger steel towers. While the city wanted the power lines to be buried, it discovered it lacked the authority to force Xcel to do this or even to create a taxing district to fund such.

Marshall Fire

In late December 2021, the Marshall Fire raged through the parched lands near Boulder, Colorado. Marshall Fire is the most destructive in Colorado's history. The fire impacted City of Louisville, City of Superior and unincorporated Boulder County areas. Within Louisville, 553 homes were destroyed with an additional 45 damaged. Over 21,000 people in Louisville and 13,000 in Superior were ultimately evacuated while the fire was spreading due to unusual 100-mile-per-hour winds. Additionally, one person died and another is missing and presumed dead. The cause of the fire has not been officially announced, pending an investigation.  However, an incident report filed by a ranger with Boulder Open Space and Mountain Parks identified two ignition points for the fire. The first ignition point was a shed that began to burn at approximately 11:30AM MST, 30 December 2021.  The second ignition point was upwind from the first, and started around noon of the same day on "western side of the Marshall Mesa trailhead."

Geography
Louisville is located in southeastern Boulder County. U.S. Highway 36 (the Denver-Boulder Turnpike) forms the southwest border of the city.

Demographics 

As of the census of 2000, there were 18,937 people, 7,216 households, and 4,950 families residing in the city. As of the census of 2010 there were 18,376 people. The racial makeup of the city was 91.17% White, 0.93% African American, 0.54% Native American, 3.55% Asian, 0.08% Pacific Islander, 1.69% from other races, and 1.90% from two or more races. Hispanic or Latino of any race were 5.02% of the population.

There were 7,216 households, out of which 41% had children under the age of 18 living with them, 56% were married couples living together, 9% had a female householder with no husband present, and 31% were non-families. 22% of all households were made up of individuals, and 5% had someone living alone who was 65 years of age or older. The average household size was 2.6 and the average family size was 3.1.

In the city, the population was spread out, with 29% under the age of 18, 6% from 18 to 24, 36% from 25 to 44, 23% from 45 to 64, and 6% who were 65 years of age or older. The median age was 36 years. For every 100 females, there were 98.6 males. For every 100 females age 18 and over, there were 95 males.

The median income for a household in the city was $69,945, and the median income for a family was $92,121. Males had a median income of $57,159 versus $36,659 for females. The per capita income for the city was $31,828. 3% of the population and 2% of families were below the poverty line. 2% of those under the age of 18 and 6% of those 65 and older were living below the poverty line.

Economy
Rogue Wave Software, a software development company, and the Space Systems component of Sierra Nevada Corporation, a prime systems integrator for commercial spacecraft, are located in Louisville.  Uber has an office in Louisville.

Arts and culture
Louisville's historical downtown includes Steinbaugh Pavilion, which is used for a concert venue during the summer Louisville Street Faire, which runs on Friday nights and features local bands and street vendors  and an ice rink in the winter months. 740 Front Street, previously the Old Louisville Inn, claims to be "one of Colorado’s two oldest bars, the oldest ongoing tavern license in the state". There is also a farmers' market that runs on Saturdays from May to October along the 800 block of Front Street, centered around the Steinbaugh Pavilion.  The city has about 32 miles of recreational trails.

Education
There are six public schools, six private schools, and one public library in Louisville. The public secondary schools are Monarch High School, Monarch K-8, and Louisville Middle School. Nearby higher education institutions include University of Colorado at Boulder, Naropa University, and Front Range Community College (in Longmont and Westminster).

See also
Colorado cities and towns
Boulder County, Colorado
Front Range Urban Corridor

References

External links
 City of Louisville official website
 Louisville Chamber of Commerce

Cities in Boulder County, Colorado
Cities in Colorado
Denver metropolitan area
Populated places established in 1877
1877 establishments in Colorado